Sumiton is a city in Jefferson and Walker counties in the State of Alabama. It incorporated in 1952. At the 2010 census the population was 2,520, down from 2,665 in 2000.

Geography
Sumiton is located at  (33.747213, -87.046716).

Demographics

2000 census
At the 2000 census, there were 2,665 people, 1,096 households, and 780 families living in the city. The racial makeup of the city was 93.21% White, 3.60% Black or African American, 0.34% Native American, 0.15% Asian, 0.04% Pacific Islander, 0.60% from other races, and 2.06% from two or more races. 0.71% of the population were Hispanic or Latino of any race.

Of the 1,096 households 28.0% had children under the age of 18 living with them, 54.2% were married couples living together, 13.0% had a female householder with no husband present, and 28.8% were non-families. 27.1% of households were one person and 12.2% were one person aged 65 or older. The average household size was 2.39 and the average family size was 2.89.

The age distribution was 21.4% under the age of 18, 9.3% from 18 to 24, 25.8% from 25 to 44, 27.7% from 45 to 64, and 15.8% 65 or older. The median age was 40 years. For every 100 females, there were 91.5 males. For every 100 females age 18 and over, there were 90.4 males.

The median household income was $42,364 and the median family income  was $36,086. Males had a median income of $36,979 versus $26,250 for females. The per capita income for the city was $15,032. About 15.5% of families and 17.0% of the population were below the poverty line, including 20.1% of those under age 18 and 16.7% of those age 65 or over.

2010 census
At the 2010 census, there were 2,520 people, 1,002 households, and 696 families living in the city. The racial makeup of the city was 93.2% White, 4.0% Black or African American, 0.4% Native American, 0.2% Asian, 0.0% Pacific Islander, 0.6% from other races, and 1.6% from two or more races. 0.8% of the population were Hispanic or Latino of any race.

Of the 1,002 households 26.1% had children under the age of 18 living with them, 51.9% were married couples living together, 12.3% had a female householder with no husband present, and 30.5% were non-families. 27.1% of households were one person and 12.7% were one person aged 65 or older. The average household size was 2.50 and the average family size was 3.02.

The age distribution was 22.7% under the age of 18, 9.0% from 18 to 24, 23.2% from 25 to 44, 27.5% from 45 to 64, and 17.6% 65 or older. The median age was 41.4 years. For every 100 females, there were 88.6 males. For every 100 females age 18 and over, there were 90.3 males.

The median household income was $34,036 and the median family income  was $45,028. Males had a median income of $43,500 versus $27,813 for females. The per capita income for the city was $19,162. About 15.4% of families and 18.4% of the population were below the poverty line, including 19.4% of those under age 18 and 9.6% of those age 65 or over.

2020 census

As of the 2020 United States census, there were 2,444 people, 993 households, and 574 families residing in the city.

History
The city's original name was Summit, named by founder Nicholas M. Norris after the community's high elevation. The current mayor of Sumiton is Petey Ellis, who is in his eighth term. The current council members are as follows: Place 1: Micah Harrison, Place 2: Floyd Burton, Place 3: Kenneth Russell, Place 4: Bill Fowler, and Place 5: Jim Dodd.

Schools
Sumiton is home to two public schools, Sumiton Middle School and Sumiton Elementary School. Their mascot is the Bulldogs.
Sumiton has one private school, Sumiton Christian School, which includes K-12th grades. Their mascot is the Eagles.
Bevill State Community College is also located in Sumiton.

Notable people
 Harlan Mathews, United States Senator from Tennessee in 1993 and 1994
 Jimi Westbrook, member of Little Big Town

References

External links

Cities in Alabama
Cities in Walker County, Alabama
Cities in Jefferson County, Alabama
Birmingham metropolitan area, Alabama